Frank Hayes Foutz (1877-1961) was a Major League Baseball first baseman. He was born on April 8, 1877, in Baltimore, Maryland. He was the brother of Dave Foutz. He played 1 season in the Major League Baseball, with the Baltimore Orioles in 1901. Foutz played in 20 games, recording 17 hits in 72 at bats (.236 batting average). Frank died on December 25, 1961, in Lima, Ohio.

External links

1877 births
1961 deaths
Baseball players from Maryland
Baltimore Orioles (1901–02) players
Minor league baseball managers
Toronto Canucks players
Meriden Silverites players
Toledo Swamp Angels players
Toledo Mud Hens players
Lima Cigarmakers players
Pueblo Indians players
Davenport Prodigals players